The 2011 TCU Horned Frogs football team represented Texas Christian University in the 2011 NCAA Division I FBS football season. The Horned Frogs were led by 11th-year head coach Gary Patterson and played their home games at Amon G. Carter Stadium. They were members of the Mountain West Conference. They finished the season 11–2, 7–0 in Mountain West play to win their third straight conference championship. They were invited to the Poinsettia Bowl, where they defeated Western Athletic Conference champion Louisiana Tech, 31–24.

This was the Horned Frogs last year as a member of the Mountain West. They were originally set to become a member of the Big East Conference in the 2012 season. However, on October 10, they accepted a bid to join the Big 12 Conference. The Big 12 has several other former members of the Southwest Conference, notably Baylor, one of TCU's most intense rivals in history.

Before the season
During the 2010–2011 campaign, the Horned Frogs finished the season undefeated, 13–0 and being voted #2 in the Coaches and AP polls. The Horned Frog's 2010 season was capped off with a 21–19 victory over Wisconsin in the 2011 Rose Bowl. During the off-season, quarterback Andy Dalton, who had won 43 games for TCU, left for the NFL, leading to Casey Pachall to take over as quarterback. At the Mountain West Conference media day, the Horned Frogs were picked to finish 2nd in the conference.

Recruiting
TCU's recruiting class was ranked #26 by Rivals.com and #28 by Scout.com. The top 10 recruits according to ESPN grades are listed below:

Schedule

Regular season
TCU began the season being upset by then-former (and future) conference rival Baylor 48–50, ending the Horned Frogs' 25-regular-season-game winning streak. TCU then won their next three games against Air Force, Louisiana–Monroe and Portland State before losing in overtime 33–40 to SMU in Battle for the Iron Skillet.

After the loss against SMU, TCU won out the rest of its regular-season schedule to win its third straight Mountain West Conference championship. TCU's biggest victory was against #5 Boise State at Bronco Stadium. TCU won the game 36–35 on a two-point conversion. The victory ended Boise State's record 65-game regular-season home winning streak and 47-game conference home winning streak. After Houston lost the 2011 Conference USA Football Championship Game, there was a chance for TCU to reach a BCS game for a third straight year. However, TCU finished #18 in the BCS standings and missed out on attending a BCS bowl.

2011 Poinsettia Bowl

On December 4, 2011, the TCU Horned Frogs accepted an invite to represent the MWC. Their opponents were the Louisiana Tech Bulldogs, the 2011 WAC champions. The game was played at Snapdragon Stadium.

TCU won the game 31-24. With the win, TCU coach Gary Patterson picked up his 109th victory, tying Dutch Meyer for the most wins in TCU history.

Rankings

References

TCU
TCU Horned Frogs football seasons
Mountain West Conference football champion seasons
Poinsettia Bowl champion seasons
TCU Horned Frogs football